The videography of Il Divo composes by the documentaries or concerts published in format DVD, Blu-ray or digital format, or by the videos musical officials, that have published by the discográficas associated to the quartet; Sony Music; Syco Music or Columbia Records.

Il Divo Is a grouping of singers of classical training, that tackles the popular repertoire and have transformed in an unprecedented success all over the world. The group is a vocal concept, based in the technical faculties of his singers, choosing a repertoire of the most varied, in style and period, that accompanies of an orchestra.

Music videos

Video albums: Documentary and concert

TV appearances

 It Takes Two (BBC 2 London 13/11/2015)
 ¡Qué tiempo tan feliz! (Telecinco Spain - 07/11/2015)
 Loose Women (ITV1 TV London 04/11/2015)
 QVC TV (London 03/11/2015)
 Music Industry Trusts Award (London 02/11/2015)
 Asaichi (NHK TV Japan 30/10/2015)
 Morning Market (Japan 30/10/2015)
 Despierta América (Miami 21/10/2015)
 Planet TV (Belgrade-2014)
 RTV (Slovenia-2014)
 The Talk (United States-2014)
 Which so happy time! (Spain-2013)
 America's Got Talent (United States-2013)
 Street Smart (2013)
 The Saturday Night Show (2013)
 The night in peace (Spain-2012)
 Which so happy time! (Spain-2012)
 RTL Klub (2012)
 Furusato (Japan-2012)
 Strictly Eats Dancing: It Takes Two (2012)
 Herman (Portugal-2011)
 To Hollywood Christmas Celebration at the Grove (2011)
 Today (2011)
 Daybreak (2011)
 Sortilegio (Soap opera) - (Mexico-2009)
 Live with Kelly and Michael (2005-2008)
 Xposé (2008)
 Idol (2008)
 With the first to the 2007 (Spain-2007)
 Disk of the Year (Spain-2006)
 Look who dances! (Spain-2006)
 This Morning (2004-2006)
 Here there is tomato (Spain-2006)
 Operation triumph (Spain-2006)
 The Tonight Show with Jay Leno (2005-2006)
 Dancing with the Stars (2006)
 Fifa World Cup 2006 (Germany-2006)
 Dancing with the Stars (Portugal-2006)
 Arucitys (2006)
 Good Morning America (2006)
 All-Time Greatest Party Songs (2005)
 Christmas Mania 2005 (2005)
 The Royal Variety Performance 2005 (2005)
 Wetten, dass..? (2005)
 The nocheBuena (Spain-2005)
 Top of the Pops (2005)
 Herman (Portugal-2005)
 UK Music Hall of Fame: Biggest Selling Artists of the 21st Century (2005)
 Dancing with the Stars (2005)
 Tickled Pink (2005)
 Symphonic show: Them stars chantent leurs idoles (2005)
 Ellen: The Ellen DeGeneres Show (United States-2005)
 The 32nd Annual Daytime Emmy Awards (2005)
 The View (2005)
 Each day (Spain-2005)
 Disk of the Year (Spain-2005)
 The Oprah Winfrey Show (United States-2005)
 GMTV (2004-2005)
 Cilla Live (2004)
 The Late Late Show (2004)
 Today with Give and Mel (United States-2004)
 Kelly (United States-2004)

See also
 Il Divo discography

References 

Il Divo
Music videographies